Club Deportivo Los Boliches was a Spanish football team based in Fuengirola, Málaga, in the autonomous community of Andalusia. Founded in 1973, it was dissolved in 2001 after a merger with UD Fuengirola, thus becoming UD Fuengirola Los Boliches.

Club background
Club Deportivo Fuengirola - (1931–1992) → ↓
Club Atlético Fuengirola - (1982–1992) → ↓
Unión Deportiva Fuengirola - (1992–2001) → ↓
Asociación Deportiva Balompédica Fuengirola - (1984–1992) → ↑
Unión Deportiva Fuengirola Los Boliches - (2001–present)
Club Deportivo Los Boliches - (1973–2001) → ↑

Season to season

2 seasons in Segunda División B
6 seasons in Tercera División

External links
BDFutbol team profile
ArefePedia team profile 

Defunct football clubs in Andalusia
Association football clubs established in 1973
Association football clubs disestablished in 2001
1973 establishments in Spain
2001 disestablishments in Spain
Fuengirola